The Russian Futsal Superleague (complete official name Parimatch-Russian Futsal Championship among the club teams of Superleague) is the premier professional futsal league in Russia. It was founded in 1991. The Super League, which is played under UEFA rules, currently consists of 9 teams.

Champions and prize winners

Teams 2020-2021

References

External links
 Site of Association of Russian Futsal 
 Futsalplanet.com 

 
Futsal competitions in Russia
futsal
Russia
1991 establishments in Russia
Sports leagues established in 1991
Professional sports leagues in Russia